Charles (II) le Moyne de Longueuil, Baron de Longueuil (December 10, 1656 – June 7, 1729) was the first native-born Canadian to be made Baron in New France.

Charles le Moyne de Longueuil was the eldest son of Charles le Moyne de Longueuil et de Châteauguay and spent his childhood in France as a page to one of Governor Frontenac's relatives. He was a military officer and governor of Trois-Rivières. He was appointed governor of Montreal in 1724.

When the Governor General of New France, Vaudreuil died in 1725, Longueuil was made responsible for the general administration of New France, until a new governor could be appointed. He was disappointed that the position was not given to him, being a natural progression from the governing of Trois-Rivieres. and later of Montreal, and, for a time, acting administrator of New France.

During his life he owned 10 slaves.

See also

 Canadian Hereditary Peers

References 

 

1656 births
1729 deaths
Barons of Longueuil
People of New France
Governors of Montreal
Le Moyne family
18th-century Canadian politicians
French slave owners